Jo Ann Havrilla (born May 30, 1950) is an American actress. She played Penny Pingleton's racist mother Prudence Pingleton in the original film version of Hairspray in 1988. She is also known as Joann Havrilla.

Filmography

References

Living people
American film actresses
20th-century American actresses
21st-century American actresses
Place of birth missing (living people)
1950 births